Below is a partial list of shows that were previously streamed on the Philippine web-based channel, Kapamilya Online Live. For its currently streaming shows, see the list of programs streamed by Kapamilya Online Live.

Previous original programs

Live-gap programs
 2G2BT: BreakTrue 
 Ang Reaksyon Mo ay Akin 
 Ang Sa Iyo ay Akin: Unscripted 
 A Soldier's Heart: The Final Salute Live Gap Show 
 Bagong Umaga: The BREAKing Dawn 
 Breaktime sa Showtime 
 IbaYanihan 
 Love Thy Chikahan 
 FPJAP: Ang Pambansang Pagtatapos Live Gap Show 
 FPJAP: Tuloy ang Laban at Kwentuhan 
 Huwag Kang Mangamba: The Live Gap Show 
 Kapamilya Chat Presents Viral Scandal: The End of Scandal Live Gap Show 
 PBB Kumunect Tayo: Primetime Show 
 PBB Kumulitan 
 TV Patrol: Facebook Live 
 The Broken Marriage Vow: Gigil Gap Show 
 Walang Hanggang Kumustahan 
 Your Face Sounds Familiar: KaFamiliar Online Live 
 Darna: Live Gap Show 
 Dream Maker Online Hub

Newscast
 News Patrol

Public service
 G Diaries 
 Iba 'Yan! 
 KBYN: Kaagapay ng Bayan
 Paano Kita Mapasasalamatan?

Teleserye
 100 Days to Heaven 
 A Love to Last 
 And I Love You So 
 Ang sa Iyo ay Akin 
 A Soldier's Heart 
 Asintado 
 Bagani 
 Bagong Umaga 
 Bawal Lumabas: The Series 
 Be Careful With My Heart 
 Be My Lady 
 Forevermore 
 FPJ's Ang Probinsyano  
 Halik  
 Honesto  
 Hinahanap-Hanap Kita 
 Hiwaga ng Kambat 
 Hoy, Love You! 
 Huwag Kang Mangamba 
 Huwag Ka Lang Mawawala 
 He's Into Her (seasons 1 and 2) 
 Init sa Magdamag 
 Kadenang Ginto 
 La Vida Lena 
 Los Bastardos  
 Love Thy Woman 
 Maalaala Mo Kaya 
 Magpahanggang Wakas 
 Marry Me, Marry You 
 Mars Ravelo's Darna 
 May Bukas Pa 
 Momay 
 Mula sa Puso 
 Nasaan Ka Nang Kailangan Kita 
 Nathaniel 
 Nang Ngumiti ang Langit 
 Pangako Sa 'Yo 
 Parasite Island 
 Pasión de Amor 
 Precious Hearts Romances Presents: Araw Gabi 
 Precious Hearts Romances Presents: Bud Brothers 
 Pure Love 
 Run To Me 
 Sana Dalawa ang Puso 
 Since I Found You 
 Sino ang Maysala?: Mea Culpa 
 The Blood Sisters 
 The Broken Marriage Vow 
 The General's Daughter 
 The Good Son 
 Two Wives 
 Walang Hanggan 
 Walang Hanggang Paalam 
 Wansapanataym presents: Annika PINTAsera 
 Wansapanataym presents: Switch Be With You 
 Wansapanataym presents: oFISHially Yours 
 Wansapanataym presents: Gelli in a Bottle 
 Wansapanataym presents: ManiKEN ni Monica 
 Wildflower 
 Viral Scandal

Reality
 Idol Philippines (season 2) 
 Pinoy Big Brother: Connect 
 Pinoy Big Brother: Kumunity Season 10 
 Your Face Sounds Familiar (season 3)

Game
 Celebrity Playtime 
 Pilipinas, Game KNB? 
 I Can See Your Voice (season 3) 
 I Can See Your Voice (season 4)

Comedy
 Goin' Bulilit

Talk
 Ask Angelica 
 Gandang Gabi, Vice! 
 Good Vibes with Edu 
 I Feel U 
 LSS: The Martin Nievera Show 
 Real Talk: The Heart of Matter 
 Showbiz Pa More!

Informative
 Swak na Swak

Previous acquired programs

American series
 Almost Paradise

Chinese drama
 Count Your Lucky Stars

Specials
 Ang Pagbabalik ng Ibong Adarna 
 Napapanahong Bayani: Gawad Geny Lopez Jr. Bayaning Pilipino Special 
 Love Unlock  
 Fedelina: A Stolen Life 
 Ikaw ang Liwanag at Ligaya: The 2020 ABS-CBN Christmas Special 
 Sa Likod ng Balita: The 2020 ABS-CBN News Yearend Special 
 TeleRadyo Salubong 2021 
 Hello Stranger: Marathon Special 
 Be The Light: The BGYO Launch 
 Himig 11th Edition: The Finals 
 Be Careful With My Heart: The Global Kapit-Bisig Day 
 BINI: The Launch 
 Noy 
 Isang Tinig, Isang Lahi (One Voice, One People): Live Aid Philippines 
 ASAP Natin 'To: Kapamilya Forever Day 
 Star Magic Black Pen Day 
 State of The Nation Address 2021 
 State of The Nation Address 2022 
 He's Into Her: The Benison Ball 
 Heroes in the Hot Zone 
 Andito Tayo Para Sa Isa't Isa: The 2021 ABS-CBN Christmas Special 
 The Healing Eucharist: Christmas Eve Mass 
 PBB Kumunity Season 10: Big PasKoncert 
 Sa Likod ng Balita: The 2021 ABS-CBN News Yearend Special 
 One Music X (1MX) Manila 2021 
 Harapan 2022: An ABS-CBN News Special 
 All Time HIH: The Road to He's Into Her Season 2 
 Halalan 2022: The ABS-CBN News Special Coverage 
 Halalan 2022: The ANC Special Coverage 
 TWOropang LOL Live in Bacolod 
 Mutya Ng Pilipinas 2022 Grand Coronation Night 
 Asian Academy Creative Awards 2022 
 Tayo ang Ligaya ng Isa't Isa: The 2022 ABS-CBN Christmas Special 
 MMK Grand Kumustahan 
 Star Cinema is Back2Back (The Making of "Labyu With An Accent" and "Partners In Crime") 
 One Dream: The BINI and BGYO Concert 
 Sa Likod ng Balita: The 2022 ABS-CBN News Yearend Special 
 Salubong 2023: The ABS-CBN News New Year Countdown 
 Anim na Dekada... Nag-iisang Vilma 
 Rise With You

Holy week specials
 The Bible 
 The Healing Eucharist Holy Week Masses 
 The Seven Last Words 
 Star Cinema movies
 Unexpectedly Yours 
 Four Sisters and a Wedding 
 Hello, Love, Goodbye 
 She's the One 
 My Perfect You 
 Love You to the Stars and Back 
 Seven Sundays 
 It Takes a Man and a Woman 
 Princess DayaReese 
 Crazy Beautiful You 
 Maybe This Time 
 Catch Me, I'm in Love 
 Exes Baggage 
 My Ex and Whys 
 Huwag Kang Mangamba: The Holy Week Special 
 The Best of MMK 
 "Flyers"/"Bisikleta"

References

ABS-CBN
ABS-CBN Corporation